Krasnoye Selo (lit. Red village) is a municipal town in Krasnoselsky District of the federal city of St. Petersburg, Russia. It is located south-southeast of the city center. Population:  

It was founded in the early 18th century, as a suburban village south of St. Petersburg. In 1764, the village had a paper mill, located near the road leading to St. Petersburg. During the 19th century, Krasnoye Selo developed as a recreational suburb of the capital with numerous summer dachas and villas, including the summer residences of the royals.

In late tsarist times, Krasnoye Selo was the location of the annual military manoeuvres presided over by the tsar himself. It was in Krasnoye Selo that, on Saturday July 25, 1914, the council of ministers was held at which Tsar Nicholas II decided to intervene in the Austro-Serbian conflict, thereby bringing about the First World War.

During World War II, Krasnoye Selo was under German occupation from 12 September 1941 until 19 January 1944.

Krasnoye Selo was granted town status in 1925, and in 1973 it was transferred under the jurisdiction of the city of Leningrad.

References

External links

History of Krasnoye Selo

Cities and towns under jurisdiction of Saint Petersburg
Tsarskoselsky Uyezd
Krasnoselsky District, Saint Petersburg